In July 2016, the International Union for Conservation of Nature (IUCN) listed 1163 endangered invertebrate species. Of all evaluated invertebrate species, 6.4% were listed as endangered. 
The IUCN also lists 36 invertebrate subspecies as endangered.

No subpopulations of invertebrates have been evaluated by the IUCN.

For a species to be considered endangered by the IUCN it must meet certain quantitative criteria which are designed to classify taxa facing "a very high risk of extinction". An even higher risk is faced by critically endangered species, which meet the quantitative criteria for endangered species. Critically endangered invertebrates are listed separately. There are 2150 invertebrate species which are endangered or critically endangered.

Additionally 5278 invertebrate species (29% of those evaluated) are listed as data deficient, meaning there is insufficient information for a full assessment of conservation status. As these species typically have small distributions and/or populations, they are intrinsically likely to be threatened, according to the IUCN. While the category of data deficient indicates that no assessment of extinction risk has been made for the taxa, the IUCN notes that it may be appropriate to give them "the same degree of attention as threatened taxa, at least until their status can be assessed".

This is a complete list of endangered invertebrate species and subspecies as evaluated by the IUCN.

Molluscs
There are 507 mollusc species and nine mollusc subspecies assessed as endangered.

Gastropods
There are 448 gastropod species and seven gastropod subspecies assessed as endangered.

Stylommatophora
Stylommatophora includes the majority of land snails and slugs. There are 187 species and two subspecies in the order Stylommatophora assessed as endangered.

Partulids

Achatinellids

Cerastids

Endodontids

Charopids

Helicarionids

Orthalicids

Species

Subspecies
Stock Island tree snail (Orthalicus reses reses)

Euconulids

Streptaxids

Species

Subspecies
Tayloria urguessensis subangulata

Camaenids

Helicids

Hygromiids

Other Stylommatophora species

Littorinimorpha
There are 147 species and three subspecies in the order Littorinimorpha assessed as endangered.

Hydrobiids

Bithyniids

Species

Subspecies

Assimineids

Pomatiopsids

Other Littorinimorpha species

Sorbeoconcha

Architaenioglossa

Species

Subspecies
Bellamya unicolor abyssinicus
Maizania hildebrandti thikensis

Cycloneritimorpha

Hygrophila species
There are 22 Hygrophila species assessed as endangered.

Planorbids

Lymnaeids

Neogastropoda

Other gastropod species

Bivalvia
There are 57 species and two subspecies in the class Bivalvia assessed as endangered.

Unionida
There are 54 species and two subspecies in the order Unionoida assessed as endangered.

Margaritiferids

Unionids

Species

Subspecies
Catspaw (Epioblasma obliquata obliquata)
Rough rabbitsfoot (Quadrula cylindrica strigillata)

Other Unionida species

Venerida

Cephalopods
Cirroctopus hochbergi
Opisthoteuthis mero

Cnidaria
There are 28 species in the phylum Cnidaria assessed as endangered.

Hydrozoa
Millepora striata
Millepora tuberosa

Anthozoa
There are 26 species in the class Anthozoa assessed as endangered.

Sea pens
Crassophyllum thessalonicae

Actinaria
Paranemonia vouliagmeniensis

Scleractinia

Arthropods
There are 616 arthropod species and 27 arthropod subspecies assessed as endangered.

Centipedes

Arachnids
There are 72 arachnid species assessed as endangered.

Harvestmen

Spiders

Other arachnid species

Branchiopoda

Millipedes

Malacostracans
Malacostraca includes crabs, lobsters, crayfish, shrimp, krill, woodlice, and many others. There are 170 malacostracan species and six malacostracan subspecies assessed as endangered.

Isopods

Species

Subspecies

Amphipods

Species

Subspecies
Niphargus elegans zagrebensis

Decapods
There are 154 decapod species and two decapod subspecies assessed as endangered.

Parastacids

Gecarcinucids

Atyids

Cambarids
Species

Subspecies
Withlocoochee light-fleeing cave crayfish (Procambarus lucifugus lucifugus)

Potamonautids

Potamids

Palaemonids
Species

Subspecies
Macrobrachium lamarrei lamarroides

Other decapod species

Insects
There are 343 insect species and 21 insect subspecies assessed as endangered.

Blattodea

Orthoptera
There are 91 species and two subspecies in the order Orthoptera assessed as endangered.

Lentulids

Tetrigids

Euschmidtiids

Mogoplistids

Pamphagids

Crickets
Species

Subspecies
Phaloria insularis insularis

Acridids

Tettigoniids

Phaneropterids
Species

Subspecies
Isophya longicaudata longicaudata

Hymenoptera

Lepidoptera
Lepidoptera comprises moths and butterflies. There are 51 species in the order Lepidoptera assessed as endangered.

Swallowtail butterflies

Lycaenids

Nymphalids

Other Lepidoptera species

Beetles
There are 72 beetle species assessed as endangered.

Dytiscids

Stag beetles

Geotrupids

Longhorn beetles

Scarabaeids

Other beetle species

Odonata
Odonata includes dragonflies and damselflies. There are 97 species and 19 subspecies in the order Odonata assessed as endangered.

Platystictids

Platycnemidids
Species

Subspecies

Megapodagrionids

Gomphids
Species

Subspecies

Calopterygids
Species

Subspecies
Matrona basilaris japonica

Coenagrionids
Species

Subspecies
Pseudagrion torridum hulae

Aeshnids
Species

Subspecies

Libellulids
Species

Subspecies

Other Odonata
Species

Subspecies

Other insect species

Echinoderms

Other invertebrate species

See also 
 Lists of IUCN Red List endangered species
 List of least concern invertebrates
 List of near threatened invertebrates
 List of vulnerable invertebrates
 List of critically endangered invertebrates
 List of recently extinct invertebrates
 List of data deficient invertebrates

References 

Invertebrates
Endangered invertebrates